The Girjas case is a landmark decision of the Supreme Court of Sweden.

Judgment 
On January 23, 2020, the Supreme Court delivered its verdict. The Court's 92-page verdict is long by Swedish standards.

Significance 
The use of the word "Lapp" by Swedish government lawyers was criticised as some Sámi consider the term offensive.

References

Citations

Bibliography

External links 
 Full text of the judgment (in Swedish)

2020 in case law
2020 in Sweden
Sámi in Sweden